Prime Minister's Fee Reimbursement Scheme is a scholarship to reimburse tuition fees and on and off mandatory charges for the students of Balochistan, FATA and Gilgit Baltistan.

References

Scholarships in Pakistan
Higher Education Commission (Pakistan)
Nawaz Sharif administration